Tatiana Shchegoleva is a Russian basketball player who competed for the Russian National Team at the 2008 Summer Olympics, winning the bronze medal.

References
 The Official Website of the Beijing 2008 Olympic Games

Living people
Russian women's basketball players
Basketball players at the 2004 Summer Olympics
Basketball players at the 2008 Summer Olympics
Olympic bronze medalists for Russia
Olympic basketball players of Russia
Olympic medalists in basketball
Medalists at the 2008 Summer Olympics
Medalists at the 2004 Summer Olympics
Year of birth missing (living people)